The Journal of African Cultural Studies is a biannual peer-reviewed academic journal covering research on African culture, including African literatures, both written and oral, performance arts, visual arts, music, the role of the media, the relationship between culture and power, culture and gender issues and sociolinguistic topics of cultural interest. It was established in 1988 as African Languages and Culture and obtained its current title in 1998.

History 
This journal continues African Language Studies. There was a 10-year hiatus between the publications.

External links

References

African studies journals
Publications established in 1988
Biannual journals
Cultural journals
English-language journals
Routledge academic journals